Harold M. Etherington is an American sound engineer. He was nominated for an Academy Award in the category Best Sound for the film Silver Streak.

Selected filmography
 Silver Streak (1976)

References

External links

Year of birth missing (living people)
Possibly living people
American audio engineers